Kim Nam-gu (8 October 1923 – 25 September 2013) was a South Korean sports shooter. He competed in the trap event at the 1972 Summer Olympics.

References

1923 births
2013 deaths
South Korean male sport shooters
Olympic shooters of South Korea
Shooters at the 1972 Summer Olympics
Shooters at the 1974 Asian Games
Asian Games medalists in shooting
Place of birth missing
Asian Games bronze medalists for South Korea
Medalists at the 1974 Asian Games
20th-century South Korean people
21st-century South Korean people